Trinity Episcopal School is a K-8 independent co-ed day school in Austin, Texas.  The school was founded in 1999 in a rented blue house near the University of Texas campus.  Since that inaugural year, the school has grown from 13 students to more than 500, moved to a  campus in West Lake Hills and built six buildings. Trinity Episcopal School is accredited by the Independent Schools Association of the Southwest and the Southwestern Association of Episcopal Schools.

Academics 

Trinity's Lower School uses a workshop approach for the teaching of reading and writing. Developed by Lucy Calkins of Columbia University, the workshop approach develops writers who have confidence in their own voices and fluency with a number of different formats and styles.  Trinity's math program develops math fluency, treating the subject as a language to understand rather than a series of facts to memorize. The vertically integrated curriculum embeds basic algebraic and geometric concepts into the earliest math education and incorporates the workshop approach developed by Catherine Fosnot of the City College of New York.

In the Middle School, students have an opportunity to complete both Algebra 1 and Geometry by the end of their 8th grade year.  Students can also earn high school credit for a number of other classes, including Latin, Speech, and Integrated Physics and Chemistry.

Trinity's Head of School is Marie Kidd.

Episcopal Tradition 
Trinity offers daily chapel in both the Lower School and the Middle School. The Chaplain is the Rev. Ken Malcolm.

Athletics 
The Trinity Tornado competes in the Austin Inter Parochial League (AIPL) in the following sports:

Girls:
Cross-Country, Volleyball, Basketball, Lacrosse, Soccer, Tennis, Track, Golf, Swimming

Boys:
Cross-Country, Tackle Football, Flag Football, Basketball, Soccer, Lacrosse, Tennis, Track, Golf, Swimming

Arts 

Trinity has an arts program that incorporates both elective courses and extracurricular activities.  The school hosts a school-wide art show each spring, has several choirs and solo opportunities, and a drama department that produces a fall drama and a spring musical.  Trinity's Varsity Choir won the Best in Class trophy at the 2009 Lone Star Showcase choral competition in Dallas.

References

External links
Trinity Episcopal School

Independent Schools Association of the Southwest
Educational institutions established in 1999
Education in Austin, Texas
Private K–8 schools in Texas
Episcopal schools in the United States